Dilip Prabhavalkar (born 4 August 1944) is an Indian Marathi actor, director, playwright and author. He has a career spanning over four decades in Hindi and Marathi theatre, television and movies. He was awarded the National Film Award for Best Supporting Actor for his portrayal of Mahatma Gandhi in the 2006 Hindi film Lage Raho Munna Bhai.

Early life
Born in Mumbai, Dilip Prabhavalkar obtained a bachelor's degree in Chemistry from Ramnarain Ruia College, Matunga. He gained his master's degree in Biophysics and a diploma from the Bhabha Atomic Research Centre, Mumbai, before working for a pharmaceutical company. He joined as a partner in a video production unit. During this period, he performed as an actor in several children's and experimental plays staged at Chhabildas. In 1991, he decided to give up this dual existence of working and doing plays simultaneously and chose acting as a career.

Career

Acting
He started performing as an actor in children's plays and experimental plays. His first major performance was in Lobh Nasava Hi Vinanti, a play written by Vijay Tendulkar and directed by Arvind Deshpande, which was well received. He went on to star in various plays including Vaasuchi Sasu, Sandhyachaya, Naatigoti, Javai Maza Bhala, Kalam 302 and Ghar Tighanche Have. He debuted on Marathi television by playing Chimanrao in the television serial Chimanrao Gundyabhau. He went on to star in television shows like Turtur and Shriyut Gangadhar Tipre. He also played various characters in Hasva Fasvi, a Marathi play.

He is known for his versatility and is known for transforming himself into the characters he plays. He gained recognition for his various comedic and dramatic film roles, notably in Ek Daav Bhutacha (1982), Zapatlela (1993) and Chaukat Raja (1991). In 1991, he decided to choose acting as a career. In children's and amateur theatre, Prabhavalkar was associated with Ratnakar Matkari's group and performed in all the plays staged by the troupe. His performances of a simpleton in Prem Kahani and Vidur in Aranyak — a play based on the Mahabharat — were awarded prizes at the Maharashtra State Drama Festival.

Prabhavalkar starred in the Bollywood movie Encounter: The Killing as an old gangster, Punappa Avade in 2002. He portrayed Mahatma Gandhi in the 2006 hit Lage Raho Munna Bhai. He reprised his role in the Telugu remake called Shankar Dada Zindabad. From the experimental stage, Prabhavalkar very easily moved to the professional stage in 1976, and since then has acted in plays from slapstick to light comedy, family drama, and melodrama, to serious discussion plays dealing with contemporary issues.

Prabhavalkar was recently seen in Faster Fene, a movie inspired by the popular Marathi book series of the same name, authored by B. R. Bhagwat, who he portrays in the film. The film is about a young boy who uncovers an educational scam using his detective prowess. In 2018, he did a talk show called Chimanrao Tey Gandhi, where he narrated the process behind each of his roles.

Writing
In 1994, he wrote a play titled Chuk Bhul Dyavi Ghyavi. He has authored 28 books and has also won a Sahitya Akademi Award for his children’s book, Bokya Satbande.

Filmography

Films

Television

Theater
Double role as Anna and the mother-in-law in Pradeep Dalvi's farce Vasuchi Sasu.
The Old Rajabhau in Chook Bhool Dyavi Ghyavi, a light comedy written by Prabhavalkar.
The caring, possessive father in Ratnakar Matkari's drama Jawai Maza Bhala.
The senile Nana in Jaywant Dalvi's Sandhyachhaya.
The double role of the debonair, flirtatious Raje and a local constable in Prof. Toradmal's Kalam 302 (adaptation of Sleuth).
The alcoholic barrister in Ratnakar Matkari's Ghar Tighancha Hava (a play on the life of Tarabai Modak).
The nondescript but determined common man in P. L. Deshpande's Ek Zunj Waryashi (an adaptation of The Last Appointment).
The father of a disabled son in Jaywant Dalvi's Natigoti.
Six characterisations in Hasvaphasvi, a comedy written by Prabhavalkar.
A buck-toothed apparently harmless man who in reality is a twisted, evil man in Salsood.
A naive, innocent schoolteacher who is assisted by a ghost in Ek Dav Bhutacha.
A disabled professor in "Waah Guru".

Awards

1972 - Best Amateur Actor ("Prem Kahani") Maharashtra State Award.
1992 - Maharashtra State Award for best actor for his portrayal of a disabled boy in the film Chaukat Raja.
1999 - Filmfare Best Actor Award(Marathi) for the film Ratraaarambh
2006 - Bal Gandharva Puraskar
2006 - National Film Award for best supporting actor in Lage Raho Munnabhai 
2008 - National Film Award  for best supporting actor in Shevri, a Marathi film.
 2010 - Sangeet Natak Akademi Award for his contribution as an actor to Indian Theatre.
 Natavarya Mama Pendse Puraskrut Natasamrat Ganpatrao Bhagwat Puraskar
 2015 - Suvarnaratna Awards(Best Actor)
 2019 - PIFF Distinguished Award for Outstanding Contribution to Indian cinema.

References

External links
 Official Site
 Bokya Satbande: Marathi movie written by Dilip prabhavalkar
"This Bapu wants to go under cover on Oct 2"
 ""
 

Indian male film actors
Male actors in Marathi cinema
Marathi people
Living people
Best Supporting Actor National Film Award winners
1944 births
Male actors in Marathi television
Recipients of the Sangeet Natak Akademi Award